Hazel Rosotti (born 1 February 1930) is a British chemist and science writer.

Early life and education 
Rossotti (née Marsh) completed her undergraduate and PhD at the University of Oxford. Her research considered the stability of metal-ion complexes, and she worked under the supervision of Robert Williams. She  graduated in 1948. In 1952 she married fellow chemist Francis Rossotti, a fellow graduate student, at St Peter-in-the-East, now part of St Edmund Hall, Oxford.

Career 
In 1962 Rossotti was appointed a Fellow and Tutor at St Anne's College, Oxford, and retired in 1997. She was an advisor to Mary Archer. Rossotti is an Honorary Fellow at St Anne's College, Oxford.

Books 
She has published several science books, including:

 1969 - Chemical Applications of Potentiometry
 1970 - H2O
 1971 - Metals
 1975 - Air
 1975 - Introducing Chemistry 
 1978 - Study of Ionic Equilibria
 1985 - Why the World Isn't Grey
 1993 - Fire 
 1998 - Diverse Atoms
 2006 - Chemistry in the Schoolroom: 1806

References 

British women chemists
British chemists
British women scientists
Alumni of the University of Oxford
British science writers
1930 births
Living people